Jeff Wolhuter (born 3 September 1981) is a South African cricket umpire. He has stood in matches in the Sunfoil 3-Day Cup tournament.

References

External links
 

1981 births
Living people
South African cricket umpires
Sportspeople from Cape Town